Sotin is a village in eastern Croatia, located a few kilometers southeast of Vukovar by the Danube. It is administratively part of the city of Vukovar, and its population is 782 (census 2011). The post code for Sotin is 32232 Sotin.

History
One Scordisci archaeological site dating back to late La Tène culture was excavated in the 1970s and 1980s as a part of rescue excavations in eastern Croatia.

Sotin (German Sotting, Hungarian Szottin) was first mentioned in 1289 as a fortress of the Vukovar jobagions. In Sotin, there is an archaeological site with a settlement of the Pannonian Kornakata tribe. Archaeological finds speak of life in the Sotin area from the Copper Age to the Younger Iron Age and the Celtic Skordisks.

Croatian War of Independence
During the Croatian War of Independence, 32 residents of Sotin were killed and another 32 are missing . A mass grave containing three bodies was discovered near the village through information obtained by Serbian authorities conducting a criminal inquest of war crimes—killing of 16 Croatian civilians in Sotin—committed by the Croatian Serb militia and Territorial Defense Forces in late 1991. In April 2013, the second mass grave was found in the village. It contained ten bodies transferred from the mass grave containing the three other bodies to a village slaughterhouse pit where animal bones were disposed of at the time. The move was made in 1997 in order to hide the bodies better. All thirteen, whose remains were found in the two graves, were killed on 26 December 1991. Two other mass graves were found previously, one at the Catholic graveyard in the village and the other in nearby vineyards.

References

Populated places in Vukovar-Syrmia County
Populated places on the Danube
Populated places in Syrmia
Archaeological sites in Croatia
La Tène culture